Alexios Ntanatsidis OLY is a Greek judoka. He began his professional career at the age of 14 after joining the Greek National team and he won a gold medal at the European Championships for cadets shortly after. In 2013, he won the gold medal at the U21 World Championships. In 2014, he won the bronze medal at the European Judo Open Championships. He also won a bronze medal at the 2018 Mediterranean Games. In recent years, he has won two bronze medals and one silver at various IJF Grand Prix and he has also won gold medals at the Asian and Oceanian Opens in 2018 and 2019 respectively. He represented Greece in the Tokyo 2020 Olympic Games.

Personal life 
Alexios was born on 20 June 1993 in Hadik, in Georgia, a region in south Georgia which was founded by Greeks who moved from Pontos. He was raised in Athens. He was enrolled by his parents at a local judo club at a young age.

References

External links
 

Greek male judoka
Living people
1993 births
Mediterranean Games bronze medalists for Greece
Mediterranean Games medalists in judo
Competitors at the 2018 Mediterranean Games
European Games competitors for Greece
Judoka at the 2015 European Games
Judoka at the 2019 European Games
Judoka at the 2020 Summer Olympics
Olympic judoka of Greece
Sportspeople from Athens

Sambo (martial art) practitioners
21st-century Greek people